Mint-made errors are errors during the minting process. Groups of coins with distinctive characteristics are known as varieties. The term variety applies to coins with both intended and unintended differences while the term error refers only to coins with unintended differences. Nevertheless, not all errors are varieties. Although there may be many identical examples of some errors, others are unique. For example, there may be many indistinguishable examples of coins with a specific die crack, while off-center strikes tend to be unique. Being unique does not mean that an error is valuable.
Although no other coin may be similar to a coin with an off-center strike, off-center strikes happen often enough that buyers can choose from many examples each of which varies slightly from the other. Mint error coins can be the result of deterioration of the minting equipment, accidents or malfunctions during the minting process, or intentional interventions by mint personnel. Accidental error coins are perhaps the most numerous and in modern minting are usually very rare, making them valuable to numismatists. Intentional intervention by mint personnel does not necessarily include a deliberate attempt to create an error, but usually involves an action intended to improve quality that miscarries and creates error coins instead. Errors can be the result of defective planchets, defective dies or the result of mistakes made during striking. The planchet, die, and striking (or PDS) classification system happens to correspond with the mintmarks of the three largest U.S. mints, Philadelphia, Denver, and San Francisco. Not all errors fall neatly within the categories. Sometimes design elements are missing from coins because die crevices are filled with grease. Labels used to identify specific categories of errors sometimes describe the cause of the error (die crack, rotated die, clipped planchet). Other errors names describe what the viewer sees when looking at the coin (wavy steps, trails, missing element) while others have names that were adapted for use (mule, cud, brockage). The result is that some errors are known by multiple names. Filled die errors are also known as missing design element errors and as strike throughs. As is noted below under the discussion of missing design element coins, some errors have multiple causes. A rare error that sold for $5462.50 on Heritage Auctions in August 2010 is an undated U.S nickel struck on top of a 1960 5 centavos. Foreign coins struck on a U.S coin planchet or vice versa are very uncommon and hold a high value.

Authentic error coins should not be confused with coins that are damaged after being minted, which is known as post-mint damage.

Planchet preparation errors
Mints purchase long strips of metal which are fed through blanking machines that punch out disks known as blank planchets (or simply as planchets or blanks) on which coins are struck.  This determines the size and shape of eventual coins.

Blank planchet
The punched disks are first known as "type-1" blanks (or planchets).  After an upending mill adds uniform rounded rims, the disks are called "type-2" blanks (or planchets). Occasionally, Type-1 and Type-2 blanks aren't further processed, ‘escape’ the mint facility and enter circulation. Type-2 blanks may also be considered striking errors as they are prepared correctly, but are released without having been struck.

Clipped planchet
A misfeed can occur when the metal strip is fed through the blanking machine. The punches sometimes overlap the leading edge of the metal producing a straight clip. Sometimes, the punches strike an area of the strip which overlaps the hole left by the previous strike producing a curved clip. On such curved-clip coins, often the rim opposite the clip shows a distinctive distortion and loss of detail called Blakesley Effect. (See the photo with an example of a clipped planchet nickel: the odd look of the rim near the word LIBERTY is from Blakesley Effect. Sometimes punches strike the irregular trailing edge of the metal strip producing irregular clips.

Improper planchet thickness
Coins are sometimes struck on planchets that are either too thin or too thick producing underweight or overweight coins. This can be because the equipment settings cause the metal strip to be rolled to an incorrect thickness or because the metal strip was intended for another coin denomination such as a quarter planchet cut from a metal roll intended for dimes.

Lamination flaw

A lamination flaw is a planchet defect that results from metal impurities or internal stresses.  Lamination flaws cause discoloration, uneven surfaces, peeling, and splitting.

Split planchet

A split planchet coin error occurs when, during the preparation of the planchet strip, impurities such as gas, dirt, or grease become trapped under the surface of the metal blank, creating a weakness or lamination defect. This area of the metal will be weaker and may flake, peel, or split because the adhesion is poor where the foreign material is.

Split planchet errors are normally restricted to planchets composed of a solid alloy, such as U.S. cents and nickels, and the Australian fifty-cent coin. Split planchet errors should not be confused with "separation errors", which only affect clad and plated coins. Separation errors are bonding errors, not alloy errors.

A split can occur either before or after the coin is struck. The descriptive terms split before strike and split after strike are used to distinguish the respective types. A "split before strike" will show design on both sides of the coin, have coarse to fine striations,  and will usually be weakly struck. A "split after strike" will show a normal strike on one side, but will have a rough, design-free surface on the other side and will always  weigh less than a normal planchet.

Cladding flaw

Many modern coins are made of layers of different metals known as clads. These cladding layers sometimes peel, fold, or completely separate.

Hub and die errors
Mints use hubs bearing raised images similar to the images that appear on a coin to imprint indented images onto the ends of steel rods. Those rods become the dies which strike planchets making them into coins.

Hub and die errors can occur at the time dies are made, when the dies are installed into presses, and from die deterioration during use.  Modern coins are still released with hub and die errors, mainly because the defects are usually too small to be seen with the naked eye. A few exceptions exist, where the dies are used despite producing obvious flaws. The 1955 Lincoln cent is an example.

Fundamental die-setting error
A fundamental die-setting error occurs when the die is not set as the producers intended. For example, in April 2013 the Central Bank of Ireland issued a silver €10 commemorative coin in honor of James Joyce that misquoted a famous line from his masterwork Ulysses despite being warned on at least two occasions by the Department of Finance over difficulties with copyright and design.

Missing design elements
Missing mintmarks, dates, and other design elements are not distinct errors, but rather are what the observer sees when viewing other error types. A design element that is missing from the die when it is made is a fundamental error. Missing design elements that occur because dies are tilted and do not strike the planchet face-on are known as misaligned dies. A design element may be missing because foreign matter such as grease plugs the cavity into which the planchet's metal would normally flow under the striking pressure. This error is also known as a filled die and as a strike through. Although this does involve a die, it is typically thought of as a striking error, but is included here so as to provide a more complete list.

Doubled die

A doubled die occurs when a die receives an additional, misaligned impression from the hub.  Overdate coins such as the 1942/1 Mercury dime and 1918/7 buffalo nickel are also doubled dies.  They are both listed in the CONECA files as class III doubled dies.  Class III means the die was hubbed with different "designs" (or hubs that had different dates).  They are not repunched dates, since the dates were punched onto the hub.

Die cracks, die breaks, and die chips
Dies can crack during use producing jaggeds, raised lines on the surface of subsequently struck coins. In U.S. coinage, many Morgan dollar coins show slight die cracks. Dies with cracks, especially those with cracks near the edge, sometimes break. The broken piece may be retained in position or fall away. Die cracks and retained die breaks can be difficult to distinguish. Retained die breaks cross the coin's face from rim to rim with the area to one side of the break being slightly higher than the other. Coins struck after the break falls away have a raised, rounded, unstruck area along the edge. These coins are known to collectors as cuds. Sometimes, an area of a die will chip out of the center. These so-called die chips appear on subsequently struck coins as raised, rounded, unstruck areas called die chips.

Die clash
A die clash occurs when the obverse and reverse dies are damaged upon striking each other without a planchet between them.  Due to the tremendous pressure used, parts of the image of one die may be impressed on the other.  Planchets subsequently struck by the clashed dies receive the distorted image.  A well-known example is the "Bugs Bunny" Franklin half dollar of 1955, where part of the eagle's wing from the reverse gives Franklin the image of protruding teeth.

MAD clash

A MAD clash occurs when an obverse and reverse die strike each other while misaligned in relation to each other. Additional misalignment errors are discussed below.

Punching errors
Historically, some design elements near the outer perimeter of a die were added by punching because technology made it difficult to press both the central and perimeter design elements at the same time. Also, some dies were made without mintmarks or dates to permit their use at different mints and in later years. A die technician added missing elements by positioning a punch, a small steel rod with the mirror image of a letter or number on it, and striking the punch with a hammer pressing the image into the die. If the image is not strong enough, the technician will punch it a second time. Punches placed in a different position between strikes will produce a doubled image which is called a repunch. Dual punches occur when punching is repeated in a second location. Sometimes technicians use a punch with the wrong or incorrectly sized letter or number. A well known example of a small mint mark is 1945-S "Micro S" Mercury dime, when the mint used an old puncheon intended for Philippines coins. A much rarer example is the 1892-O "Micro O" Barber half dollar, which may have come about from the brief use of a mintmark puncheon intended for the quarter. Exactly the same error occurred with the 1905-O Barber dime, although numerous examples are known of this mistake. Modern equipment virtually eliminates the need to design elements by punching.

Overdates and overmintmarks
In the past, mints used dies until they broke.  At the beginning of the year, mints punched a new date over the old on dies that were in use.  For 19th-century coins, it is difficult to call an overdate an "error", as it resulted from intentional recycling of the die.   An overmintmark occurs when a second mintmark is punched over an earlier mintmark following the transfer of a die from one mint to another.  A well-known example is the 1900 Morgan silver dollar, when reverse dies with "CC" below the eagle were sent from the Carson City Mint to the New Orleans Mint, where they were given an "O".  A similar case occurred in 1938, when a reverse die for the buffalo nickel was made for the San Francisco Mint, because that year only, the Denver Mint made these coins with a "D"  punched over the "S".

Trails

Lines, called trails, transfer to coins from dies made using the modern high pressure "single pressing" process. When images are impressed into dies using the process, the displaced metal moves out into fields leaving visible lines on the dies. The dies themselves are called trail dies. Coins on which the lines appear are simply called trails. Trails were first noted on Lincoln Memorial steps found on the reverse of one cent coins minted from 1959 to 2008. The trails gave the steps the appearance of being wavy. The term wavy steps is still used to refer to trails found on the memorial steps, but the term trails is more commonly used to refer to lines found elsewhere.

Mule

A coin struck using dies never intended for use together is called a "mule".  An example is a coin struck with dies designed for different coin denominations, or a coin struck with two dies that both lack a minting year on them, resulting in a 'dateless' coin.

Misaligned dies
Dies must be properly aligned in presses for coins to be struck correctly.  Errors occur when dies are offset, tilted, or rotated. Offset errors occur when the hammer die is not centered over the anvil die typically resulting in an off-centered obverse, but centered reverse. Tilting errors occur when die surfaces are not parallel producing coins that are thinner along one edge, and sometimes causing missing design elements along the opposite edge because of insufficient pressure being exerted on that edge. Rotation errors occur when the images on the obverse and reverse dies are turned from the normal positions such as when the reverse image is at a right angle to the obverse.

Strike errors
Strike errors occur when the planchet is struck. It is a fault in the manufacturing process rather than in either the die or the planchet. Numismatists often prize strike-error coins over perfectly struck examples, which tend to be more common, but less highly than die-error coins, which are usually rarer, making them valuable.

Broadstrike
Broadstrike errors are produced when the collar die (the circular die surrounding the lower die) malfunctions. The collar prevents the metal of the blank from flowing outside the confines of the die.  All denominations of U.S. coins with a broadstrike have plain edges.

Strike through
A "strike-through" coin is made when another object comes between a blank and a die at the time of striking.  That object's outline is pressed into the blank's surface. Common examples include hard objects such as staples, metal shavings, and other coins as well as soft objects such as cloth and grease. Hard objects leave sharp outlines and, on occasion, adhere to the blank producing a coin called a "retained strike-through". A planchet "struck-through" a coin is left with an impression of the coin called brockage (discussed below). When the "strike-through object is a blank planchet the result is a uni-face coin with one struck side and one blank side (see below).  When the "struck-through" object is another coin, and that coin adheres to a die(as opposed to the other coin), the adhered coin is called a "die cap" (discussed below). Two coins which adhere to one another are called "bonded pairs". Softer objects, such as grease, can fill crevices in a die, producing a weak strike with a smudged appearance. These errors are often called "missing element coins" (discussed above and as "filled dies"). (A great example of such an error occurred in 1922, when only the Denver mint struck Lincoln cents. As a result of the mint attempting to speed up production, such a large amount of excessive grease was applied to the dies that the mintmark was obscured and therefore either nonexistent or weakened on the 1922 cents. These are very popular with collectors.)

Uni-face coin
A uni-face coin results when two planchets are stacked one atop the other at the time of striking. This produces two coins: one with only an obverse image, and a second with only the reverse image. The planchets may be centered over the die producing one complete image on each coin or off-centered producing partial images on each side. In the accompanying image of the blank reverse, the shadow or outline of Lincoln's profile from the obverse side of the coin is visible.

Die cap
A struck coin remains on a die and leaves its slowly fading impression (called brockage) on subsequently struck coins and, over time, changing shape to resemble a bottle cap.

Brockage
Brockage occurs when a mirror image of a coin is struck on a blank.   After a struck coin fails to eject, a new blank is fed between the struck coin and the hammer die. The hammer die strikes the second blank leaving its image on one side while pressing the blank against the previously stuck coin which sinks its image into opposite side. Most brockages are off-center, but fully overlapping brockages are the most desirable.

Edge strike
There are two types of edge strikes. A standing edge strike occurs when a blank "bounces" so that it is standing on edge as it is struck. Striking pressure produces edge indentations where the dies strike, and sometimes bends the blank. Repeated strikes can produce a coin that is folded flat. . Chain edge strikes occur when two blanks are fed into the space between dies at the same time. The blanks expand when struck and press together leaving each with single indented edge. Two chain edge struck coins together are known as a matched pair.

Multiple strike
A multiple strike, also referred to as a double exposure, occurs when the coin has additional images from being struck again, off center. The result is sometimes mistaken for being a "doubled die". On occasion, a coin will flip over between strikes so that the second image is that of the opposite side of the coin.

Off-center strike
An off-center coin is produced when the coin is struck once, albeit off center. Unlike a broadstrike, the punch is not in the center of the coin, but rather the edge. This results in a coin which is not circular. The coin gives a freakish appearance as a result, and various amounts of blank planchet space are visible. The coins can vary in value because of how far off center they are struck, although coins with full dates are more desirable than coins without a date or missing digits.

Double denomination
A double denomination coin is one that has been struck twice between different denomination dies such as once between nickel dies and again between quarter dies. The term is sometimes used to refer to a coin struck on the wrong planchet (see below).

Struck on wrong planchet
Sometimes planchets for one coin denomination are fed into a coin-stamping press equipped with dies of another denomination. This results in a coin that has been stamped with a design intended for a differently sized coin. The resulting errors are prized by collectors, though they are usually caught during the manufacturing process and destroyed.  Such errors are sometimes called "double denomination" coins, but that term is also used to refer to coins struck a second time with dies of a different denomination.

Some examples include cents struck on dime planchets, nickels on cent planchets, or quarters on dime planchets. This type of error should not be confused with the much rarer mule which is a coin struck between dies that were never intended to be used together such as a coin with nickel obverse and a dime reverse.

Wrong-planchet errors may also occur when the composition of the coin changes. Such situations generally arise when the mint has decided to change the alloy or plating of the coin in the new coinage year, but a few planchets from the previous year—and thus of the previous composition—have yet to be struck. Should the dies be changed for the new year while the old planchets are awaiting striking and not removed, coins using the old composition will be struck with the new year's date. Such coins are rare and often highly valued by collectors, as with the 1943 copper cents and 1944 steel cents.

A much rarer error is a denomination struck on a foreign planchet. This did occur occasionally with United States (and before that American colonial) coinage in the 17th, 18th, and 19th centuries. In the 20th century, fewer errors on foreign planchets are discovered but they still occur when the US Mint is contracted by foreign governments to produce coinage for them. Recent encapsulations and sales at auctions reveal 1995 and 1996 examples of mintages on foreign planchet. A few 1996 Lincoln cents were struck on stock designated for Singapore. There are 1997-D, 1998 and 2000 dated Lincoln cents struck on foreign planchets, but not identified by PCGS or NGC as to the country the mintage was intended.

Edge and rim errors
Blanks are surrounded by collars when struck to prevent the blank from flattening and spreading. Edge and rim errors occur when collars are either out of position or are deteriorated. A wire rim occurs when excessive pressure squeezes out metal between the collar and the edge of the die producing an extremely high thin rim. A partial collar occurs when an out-of-position collar leaves a line around the coin which is visible when looking at its edge. A partial collar is sometimes called a railroad rim when a reeded edge coin is involved as the line resembles a rail and the reeds resemble railroad ties.

Mated pair or set
A collection of two or more coins struck at the same time or during successive strikes on one or more dies, these coins with the resulting errors are related to one another, fitting together as a set. All brockages, indents, chain edge strikes, and capped die strikes have a corresponding coin, but are rarely found together.  A single coin of the set may be discovered by mint staff during quality control and removed, or the coins may be separated into different lots to be distributed separately into circulation.

Numismatic value of error coins
Like other coins, the value of errors is based, in part at least, on rarity and condition. In general, lower denomination errors are less expensive than higher denomination errors simply more such coins are minted resulting in available errors.  Modern errors are generally less expensive than older errors simply because, with billions being struck, errors are made. Because of modern technology, some types of errors are less likely to occur now, but that has not seemed to have a dramatic impact on values.   Some types of errors, such as clipped planchets, edge strikes, and foreign object strike-throughs can be faked perhaps keeping down the value of some types of mint errors. Many errors are sold ungraded because of their relatively low value. Grading services often charge more to grade a coin than it is worth. Errors are often not noted by grading services.
Overdates, mules, brockage, double denomination, and struck on the wrong planchet errors are often valuable.  Errors on ancient, medieval, and higher-value coins are usually detrimental to the coin's numismatic value.

Notable Australian coin varieties and errors
1966 "Wavy 2" 20 cents
1979 "Double Bar" 50 cents
1980 "Double Bar" 50 cents
1981 "3-1/2 claw" 20 cents
1994 "Wide Date" 50 cents
2000 "Incused Flag" Millennium 50 cents
2000 $1/10cent Mule
2001 rotated die Centenary of Federation $1
2004 "Pointy A" Large Head 20 cents

Notable U.S. coin varieties and errors
1918/7 Buffalo nickel
1918/7-S Standing Liberty quarter
1937-D 3-legged Buffalo nickel
1942/1 Mercury dime
1942/1-D Mercury dime
1943 copper cent
1944 steel cent
1955 doubled die obverse cent
1958 handsome mule Franklin half dollar
1970-S doubled die obverse cent with a small or large date
1972 doubled die obverse cent
1982 No P dime
1983 doubled die reverse cent
1984 doubled ear cent
1995 doubled die obverse cent
2004-D Wisconsin extra leaf quarters
2007 Presidential dollars missing edge lettering

Notable British coin errors

1983 "New Pence" Two pence
2005 "Pemember" Two pounds
2008 Dateless Twenty pence mule, using the obverse of the obverse of the 1982-2008 design and the reverse of the 2008-present design, both of which lack dates.
2011 "Aquatics" Fifty pence

Notable Philippine coin errors
1983 "Pithecobhaga" fifty centavos
1983 "Pygmea" ten centavos

See also

Coin collecting
Coining (mint)
Die-deterioration doubling
Doubled die
Wavy step
US error coins
Die defect

References

External links

collectorscorner.org
studium.com
maddieclashes.com 
CONECA |
Error-Ref.com –
Undated Jefferson Nickel--Struck on a 1960 Peru 5 Centavos--MS67 | Lot #5566

 
Production of coins